The Hunting is an Australian drama series starring Asher Keddie and Richard Roxburgh, screening on SBS TV and SBS on Demand on 1 August 2019. The four-part miniseries was created by Sophie Hyde and Matthew Cormack at Closer Productions, and co-directed by Ana Kokkinos.

Plot
The Hunting tells the story of two high school teachers who discover that students are sharing sexually explicit photos of their under-age friends and peers online. The revelation has consequences for four teenagers, their teachers and families in modern, multicultural Australia.

Cast

 Asher Keddie as Simone
 Richard Roxburgh as Nick
 Sam Reid as Ray 
 Jessica De Gouw as Eliza
 Luca Sardelis as Zoe
 Yazeed Daher as Nassim
 Pamela Rabe as Principal De Rossi
 Leah Vandenberg as Ravneet
 Rodney Afif as Rami
 Sachin Joab as Sandeep
 Elena Carapetis as Amanda
 Nathan Page as Sam
 James Lea as Background Artist
 Kavitha Anandasivam as Amandip "Dip"
 Joe Romeo as Marto
 Alex Cusack as Andy
 Jahanvi Bhardwaj as Josephine
 Isabel Burmester as Rosie
 Harrison Evans as Ozzy
 Connor Pullinger as Oliver
 Samuel Mazraeh as Ben
 Lian Takayidza as Ariel

Episodes

Themes
The Hunting tackles themes of misogyny, privacy, sexuality, online exploitation, sexualisation, toxic masculinity, gender and cyberbullying. Producer/director Sophie Hyde said that the film would explore how teens use technology "within sexual context and reframe the conversation to be about trust and consent, considering how we are culturally responsible".

Production
Originally titled The Hunt, funding for the series by Screen Australia was announced in July 2018. The four-part mini-series was written by Matthew Cormack and Niki Aken, and directed by Ana Kokkinos and Sophie Hyde. Produced by Rebecca Summerton, Sophie Hyde (both of Closer Productions) and Lisa Scott (of Highview Productions), it screened on SBS TV and on SBS On Demand from 1 August 2019.

Production by the Closer Productions team started in Adelaide, on 18 January 2019. Additional funding was provided by the South Australian Film Corporation and SBS.

Adelaide High School was used as a location setting.

Reception
The series had an overwhelmingly positive response, and became the highest-rated TV drama series commissioned by SBS.

Luke Buckmaster, writing for The Guardian, called the series a "very compelling, tense and prickly drama", praising the whole cast and the script, which "hangs together impressively, with admirable depth and nuance".

Wenlei Ma wrote in News.com.au that it addressed the important question "Why isn’t anyone talking about the boys?", and that the series was "wonderfully written..., incredibly tense and the performances are excellent".

Craig Mathieson titled his review in The Sydney Morning Herald: "Forget Home and Away, Australian TV needs more of this teen drama".

Chris Boyd wrote in Screenhub: The Hunting is an extremely rare event in Australian television history. The power and topicality of the story are more than matched by the quality of the writing and craft of the production. It's as hot and urgent as it is considered".

References

External links
 The Hunting on SBS On Demand

2019 Australian television series debuts
2019 Australian television series endings
Australian drama television series
English-language television shows
Special Broadcasting Service original programming
Television series about educators
Television shows set in Adelaide